Büch is a surname. Notable people with the surname include:

Boudewijn Büch (1948–2002), Dutch writer, poet, and television presenter
Nel Büch (1931–2013), Dutch sprinter

See also
Bach (surname)
Buch (surname)